The Tournette (2,351 m or 7,713 ft) is a mountain in the Bornes Massif in Haute-Savoie, France. It is the highest of the mountains surrounding Lake Annecy and has a prominence of 1,514 (4,967 ft), qualifying it as an Ultra.

Tourism
It is possible to drive most of the way up, parking at Chalet De L'Aulp. From here the summit can be reached via a well marked path in around 3 hours.  The final third of the climb requires some scrambling, but there are chains and ladders in all the difficult sections.

See also
List of Alpine peaks by prominence

References

External links

"La Tournette, France" on Peakbagger

Mountains of Haute-Savoie
Mountains of the Alps